Cophixalus sphagnicola is a species of frog in the family Microhylidae.
It is endemic to Papua New Guinea.
Its natural habitats are subtropical or tropical moist montane forests and subtropical or tropical high-altitude grassland.

References

sphagnicola
Amphibians of Papua New Guinea
Taxonomy articles created by Polbot
Amphibians described in 1982